Silver(I) fluoride is the inorganic compound with the formula AgF.  It is one of the three main fluorides of silver, the others being silver subfluoride and silver(II) fluoride. AgF has relatively few niche applications; it has been employed as a fluorination and desilylation reagent in organic synthesis and in aqueous solution as a topical caries treatment in dentistry.

The hydrates of AgF present as colourless, while pure anhydrous samples are yellow.

Preparation 
High-purity silver(I) fluoride can be produced by the heating of silver carbonate to  under a hydrogen fluoride environment, in a platinum tube:
Ag2CO3 + 2 HF -> 2 AgF + H2O + CO2

Laboratory routes to the compound typically avoid the use of gaseous hydrogen fluoride.  One method is the thermal decomposition of silver tetrafluoroborate:
AgBF4  -> AgF  +  BF3

In an alternative route, silver(I) oxide is dissolved in concentrated aqueous hydrofluoric acid, and the silver fluoride is precipitated out of the resulting solution by acetone.
Ag2O + 2 HF -> 2 AgF + H2O

Properties

Structure
The structure of AgF has been determined by X-ray diffraction. At ambient temperature and pressure, silver(I) fluoride exists as the polymorph AgF-I, which adopts a cubic crystal system with space group Fmm in the Hermann–Mauguin notation. The rock salt structure is adopted by the other silver monohalides. The lattice parameter is 4.936(1) Å, significantly lower than those of AgCl and AgBr. Neutron and X-ray diffraction studies have further shown that at 2.70(2) GPa, a structural transition occurs to a second polymorph (AgF-II) with the caesium chloride structure, and lattice parameter 2.945 Å. The associated decrease in volume is approximately ten percent. A third polymorph, AgF-III, forms on reducing the pressure to 2.59(2) GPa, and has an inverse nickel arsenide structure. The lattice parameters are a = 3.244(2) Å and c = 6.24(1) Å; the rock salt structure is regained only on reduction of the pressure to 0.9(1) GPa. Non-stochiometric behaviour is exhibited by all three polymorphs under extreme pressures.

Spectroscopy 
Silver(I) fluoride exhibits unusual optical properties. Simple electronic band theory predicts that the fundamental exciton absorption for AgF would lie higher than that of AgCl (5.10 eV) and would correspond to a transition from an anionic valence band as for the other silver halides. Experimentally, the fundamental exciton for AgF lies at 4.63 eV. This discrepancy can be explained by positing transition from a valence band with largely silver 4d-orbital character. The high frequency refractive index is 1.73(2).

Photosensitivity 
In contrast with the other silver halides, anhydrous silver(I) fluoride is not appreciably photosensitive, although the dihydrate is. With this and the material's solubility in water considered, it is unsurprising that it has found little application in photography but may have been one of the salts used by Levi Hill in his "heliochromy", although a US patent for an experimental AgF-based method was granted in 1970.

Solubility 
Unlike the other silver halides, AgF is highly soluble in water (1800 g/L), and it even has some solubility in acetonitrile. It is also unique among silver(I) compounds and the silver halides in that it forms the hydrates AgF·(H2O)2 and AgF·(H2O)4 on precipitation from aqueous solution. Like the alkali metal fluorides, it dissolves in hydrogen fluoride to give a conducting solution.

Applications

Organic synthesis 
Silver(I) fluoride finds application in organofluorine chemistry for addition of fluoride across multiple bonds.  For example, AgF adds to perfluoroalkenes in acetonitrile to give perfluoroalkylsilver(I) derivatives. It can also be used as a desulfuration-fluorination reagent on thiourea derived substrates. Due to its high solubility in water and organic solvents, it is a convenient source of fluoride ions, and can be used to fluorinate alkyl halides under mild conditions. An example is given by the following reaction:

Another organic synthetic method using silver(I) fluoride is the BINAP-AgF complex catalyzed enantioselective protonation of silyl enol ethers:

Inorganic synthesis 
The reaction of silver acetylide with a concentrated solution of silver(I) fluoride results in the formation of a chandelier-like [Ag10]2+ cluster with endohedral acetylenediide.

Tetralkylammonium fluorides can be conveniently prepared in the laboratory by the reaction of the tetralkylammonium bromide with an aqueous AgF solution.

Other 

It is possible to coat a silicon surface with a uniform silver microlayer (0.1 to 1 μm thickness) by passing AgF vapour over it at 60–800 °C. The relevant reaction is:
4 AgF + Si -> 4 Ag + SiF4

Multiple studies have shown silver(I) fluoride to be an effective anti-caries agent, although the mechanism is the subject of current research. Treatment is typically by the "atraumatic" method, in which 40% by mass aqueous silver(I) fluoride solution is applied to carious leisons, followed by sealing of the dentine with glass ionomer cement. Although the treatment is generally recognised to be safe, fluoride toxicity has been a significant clinical concern in paediatric applications, especially as some commercial preparations have had considerable silver(II) fluoride contamination in the past. Due to the instability of concentrated AgF solutions, silver diamine fluoride (Ag(NH3)2F) is now more commonly used. Preparation is by the addition of ammonia to aqueous silver fluoride solution or by the dissolution of silver fluoride in aqueous ammonia.

References 

Fluorides
Silver compounds
Metal halides
Fluorinating agents
Rock salt crystal structure